Minuscule 117 (in the Gregory-Aland numbering), ε 506 (Soden), is a Greek minuscule manuscript of the New Testament, on paper leaves. Palaeographically it has been assigned to the 15th century. It has full marginalia.

Description 

The codex contains the text of the four Gospels on 202 paper leaves (size ), with lacunae in Matthew 1:1-18; 15:18-39. The text is written in one column per page.

There is also a division according to the Ammonian Sections (in Mark 241 - 16:20), (no references to the Eusebian Canons).

The initial letters, rubrics, and scholia in red.

Text 

The Greek text of the codex is a representative of the Byzantine text-type. Hermann von Soden classified it to the group Iφb. Aland did not place it to any Category. According to the Claremont Profile Method it represents the textual family Kx in Luke 1 and Luke 20. In Luke 10 no Profile was made.

History 

Place of origin of the manuscript is Eastern Mediterranean. It came to England in the first half of the 16th century.

The manuscript once belonged to Richard Bentley. It was examined by Griesbach, Bloomfield, and Angelo Mai. C. R. Gregory saw it in 1883.

It is currently housed at the British Library (Harley MS 5731).

See also 

 List of New Testament minuscules
 Biblical manuscript
 Textual criticism

References

Further reading 

 J. J. Griesbach, Symbolae criticae ad supplendas et corrigendas variarum N. T. lectionum collectiones (Halle, 1793), pp. CLXXXXIX-CCII
 Cyril Ernest Wright, Fontes Harleiani: A Study of the Sources of the Harleian Collection of Manuscripts in the British Museum (London: British Museum, 1972), pp. 70, 461.
 Summary Catalogue of Greek Manuscripts (London: British Library, 1999- ), I, pp. 181–82.

External links 

 Harley 5731 at the British Library

Greek New Testament minuscules
15th-century biblical manuscripts
Harleian Collection